The Type UE II submarines were a class of submarines built by the German Empire during World War I as long-range mine-layers.

UE II boats carried 14 torpedoes and were armed with one 150 mm deck gun. They carried a crew of 40 and had a cruising range of about 9,400 miles. Nine were built between 1917 and 1918.

The UE IIs joined the conflict in the middle of 1917, at a time when the tide of the war was turning against Germany. In the months beforehand, the United States Navy was added to the ranks of their enemies; and the convoy system was introduced, making it difficult to engage enemy merchant shipping without being spotted by destroyer escorts. Because they entered service late in the war, the UE IIs only sank 23 ships and damaged 4 others before the end of hostilities. SM U-117 was by far the most successful U-boat, taking credit for 20 ships sunk out of the total of 23 for the entire type. The UE II's were the last of the UE class U-boats built by the German Imperial Navy; the last of the class, U-126, was commissioned on 3 October 1918, a little over a month before the armistice at Compiègne.

Post-war years

Following the end of the war, all of the Type UE II submarines were handed over to the allies as part of the Treaty of Versailles. SM U-117 was handed over to the United States where she remained in the Philadelphia Navy Yard along with other U-boats. In June 1921 she was taken out to sea and sunk as a target for aerial bombing tests conducted by the Navy and Army. SM U-118 was turned over to France but got washed ashore at Hastings in Sussex where she remained until being finally broken up in December 1919. SM U-119 was surrendered to France in November 1918. She was renamed the René Audry and saw service in the French Navy and was eventually broken up in October 1937. SM U-120 was transferred to Italy in November 1918. She was broken up soon after in April 1919. SM U-122 was surrendered to England on 26 November 1918. She later ran aground on the English east coast while on her journey to Scapa Flow. Like SM U-122, SM U-123 also ran aground on the English coast where she was broken up. SM U-124 was surrendered in December 1918 and was later broken up in Swansea in 1921. SM U-125 Surrendered to Japan in late November 1918. She served in the Japanese Navy as the O1 in 1920-21. between January and March 1921, U-125 was dismantled at Yokosuka Navy Yard. SM U-126 was handed over to the allies in November 1918 and later broken up at Upnor in 1923.

Ships sunk or damaged by Type UE II submarines

Ships in class
There were 9 Type UE II submarines commissioned into the Kaiserliche Marine.

One submarine was not completed before the armistice.

Notes

References

Bibliography

 

Submarine classes
World War I submarines of Germany
World War I minelayers of Germany